CJSS may stand for:

 CJSS-TV, a defunct television station in Cornwall, Ontario, Canada
 CJSS-FM, a radio station in Cornwall, Ontario, Canada
 CJSS, an American heavy metal band
 Canberra Japanese Supplementary School